Chartiers Run may refer to:
 Chartiers Run (Allegheny River tributary) 
 Chartiers Run (Chartiers Creek tributary)

See also 
 Chartiers (disambiguation)